Elachista kobomugi is a moth in the family Elachistidae. It was described by Sugisima in 1999. It is found in Japan on the islands of Hokkaido and Honshu.

Description
The wingspan is 7.8-9.5 mm for males and 8.5-10.6 mm for females. The forewings are white, with a greyish or brownish costal margin in the basal 1/2 or 3/4, darker towards the base. There is an elongate blackish brown mark on the basal 2/3 of the fold and another distinct blackish brown mark around the tip of the cell. There are scattered coppery scales on the distal area. The hindwings are ochreous grey. Adults have been recorded on wing in early to mid-summer. There is probably one generation per year.

The larvae feed on the leaves of Carex kobomugi, Carex macrocephala, Carex pumila, and Carex microtrica. They mine the leaves of their host plant. The mine starts from a hole on a distal part of the leaf and usually extends straight towards the base. It becomes wider gradually and eventually occupies half the width of the blade. Young larvae are yellowish, turning whitish or pale ochreous later. Pupation takes place outside of the mine.

References

Moths described in 1999
kobomugi
Moths of Japan